The 2019 Copa CONMEBOL Libertadores was the 60th edition of the CONMEBOL Libertadores (also referred to as the Copa Libertadores), South America's premier club football tournament organized by CONMEBOL.

Flamengo defeated defending champions River Plate in the final by a 2–1 score to win their second Copa Libertadores title. As champions, they qualified as the CONMEBOL representative at the 2019 FIFA Club World Cup in Qatar, and earned the right to play against the winners of the 2019 Copa Sudamericana in the 2020 Recopa Sudamericana. They also automatically qualified for the 2020 Copa Libertadores group stage.

In 2016, CONMEBOL proposed that the Copa Libertadores final to be played as a single match instead of over two legs. It was only on 23 February 2018 that CONMEBOL was able to confirm that starting from this edition, the final will be played as a single match at a venue chosen in advance, and on 11 June 2018 after its Council meeting in Moscow, the confederation confirmed that the final would be played on 23 November 2019. On 14 August 2018, CONMEBOL announced that the 2019 final would be played in Santiago, Chile at the Estadio Nacional, however, due to safety concerns derived from the 2019 Chilean protests, and after consultations with the finalist clubs and their respective football associations, CONMEBOL announced on 5 November 2019 that the match was moved to the Estadio Monumental in Lima, Peru.

Teams
The following 47 teams from the 10 CONMEBOL member associations qualified for the tournament:
Copa Libertadores champions
Copa Sudamericana champions
Brazil: 7 berths
Argentina: 6 berths
All other associations: 4 berths each

The entry stage is determined as follows:
Group stage: 28 teams
Copa Libertadores champions
Copa Sudamericana champions
Teams which qualified for berths 1–5 from Argentina and Brazil
Teams which qualified for berths 1–2 from all other associations
Second stage: 13 teams
Teams which qualified for berths 6–7 from Brazil
Team which qualified for berth 6 from Argentina
Teams which qualified for berths 3–4 from Chile and Colombia
Teams which qualified for berth 3 from all other associations
First stage: 6 teams
Teams which qualified for berth 4 from Bolivia, Ecuador, Paraguay, Peru, Uruguay and Venezuela

Schedule
The schedule of the competition was as follows. After changing the dates of the 2019 Copa América, the Brazilian Football Confederation released on 3 October 2018 its calendar for the following year, with new dates for the Copa Libertadores. The first stage matches were played on Tuesday, Wednesday, and Thursday instead of Monday and Friday in the last two seasons. The group stage matches were played in six matchdays instead of being spread over a longer period.

Draws

Qualifying stages

First stage

Second stage

Third stage

Copa Sudamericana qualification

Group stage

Group A

Group B

Group C

Group D

Group E

Group F

Group G

Group H

Final stages

Seeding

Bracket

Round of 16

Quarter-finals

Semi-finals

Final

Statistics

Top scorers

Top assists

Team of the tournament
OptaJavier Stats Perform selected the following 11 players as the team of the tournament.

See also
2019 Copa Sudamericana
2020 Recopa Sudamericana

References

External links
CONMEBOL Libertadores 2019, CONMEBOL.com

 
2019
1